The Hobart Real Tennis Club is one of the oldest sporting clubs in the Southern hemisphere, having been founded in 1875. The court is located on Davey Street in Hobart, Tasmania.  It is the oldest real tennis club in Australia and one of the oldest existing clubs in the real tennis world.

Hobart hosted the international biennial Bathurst Cup in 1985, 1999 and 2015, and has also held the Australian Open tournament for real tennis on several occasions since the mid 1990s. It was the first home court of twelve-time world champion player, Robert Fahey.

References

External links
 Official site
 Hobart Real Tennis Club on lonelyplanet.com

1875 establishments in Australia
Sports clubs established in 1875
Sports organizations established in 1875
Sports venues in Hobart
Real tennis venues
Sporting clubs in Tasmania
Sport in Hobart
Organisations based in Hobart
Tasmanian Heritage Register
Tennis venues in Australia
Tennis clubs